The 2016 Lakeside World Professional Darts Championship was the 39th World Championship organised by the British Darts Organisation, and the 31st staging at the Lakeside Country Club at Frimley Green.

The defending men's champion was Scott Mitchell, who won his first world title in 2015, but lost in the Quarter-finals to Richard Veenstra. 2013 world champion Scott Waites won the title by defeating Jeff Smith 7–1 in the final.

Lisa Ashton was the defending women's champion, having won the previous two editions, but lost to Trina Gulliver in the Quarter-finals. Gulliver then went on to win her 10th world championship title after defeating Deta Hedman 3–2 in the final.

Format and qualifiers

Men's
On 27 November 2015, Hull qualifier Vladimir Andersen was removed from the field after being suspended by the Danish Darts Union and was replaced by Sam Hewson, the player next in line according to the rankings.

Preliminary round
All matches are the best of 5 sets.

Last 32

Women's
The televised stages feature 16 players. The top 8 players in the BDO rankings over the 2014/15 season are seeded for the tournament.

Top 8
  Lisa Ashton (quarter-final)
  Fallon Sherrock (first round)
  Deta Hedman (runner-up)
  Aileen de Graaf (semi-final)
  Anastasia Dobromyslova (first round)
  Lorraine Winstanley (quarter-final)
  Zoe Jones (quarter-final)
  Trina Gulliver (winner)

Other qualifiers

Hull qualifiers

Bracket
Trina Gulliver won her tenth world title, while Deta Hedman lost her third final.

Youth
For the second time a youth championship is held. Over 64 players played down to the final in October 2015. The final was played on 7 January between Republic of Ireland player Jordan Boyce and England's Joshua Richardson in a best of five sets match. Richardson won the title with the score being 3–2 in sets.

TV coverage
As with the 2015 BDO World Darts Championship the rights for the 2016 Championships were shared between BBC Sport and BT Sport, BBC coverage was presented by Colin Murray with Bobby George with Rob Walker as the roving reporter. BT Sport coverage was presented by Ray Stubbs alongside current BDO players Tony O'Shea, Scott Mitchell and Ted Hankey with Reshmin Chowdhury replacing Helen Skelton as roving reporter.  Commentary for both broadcasters was provided by John Rawling, Vassos Alexander, George Riley and Tony Green.

References

External links
Schedule of matches at lakesideworlddarts.co.uk
BDOdarts.com
BBC.co.uk

BDO World Darts Championships
BDO World Darts Championship
BDO World Darts Championship
BDO World Darts Championship
Sport in Surrey
Frimley Green